The first clash in Rugby Union between Australia and New Zealand took place in a test match on 15 August 1903 in Sydney, New South Wales. On that occasion, New Zealand won 22–3.

Since 1931, the overall winner of the annual test matches (between one and three games in any given year) between the All Blacks and the Wallabies takes possession of the Bledisloe Cup, named after Lord Bledisloe, who donated the trophy.

Currently the rivalry is one the most played of any two international rugby union teams, and having played against each other 175 times, the All Blacks lead the series 122 to 45 with 8 draws between them and includes a large number of fixtures recorded for New Zealand as "XV" results.

Summary
The summary below is for all matches where test caps were awarded by both national unions, which leaves out all 24 meetings from 1920 to 1928, in which the governing New Zealand Rugby Union fielded the second level New Zealand XV team rather than the highest All Blacks team. The Australian Rugby Union retroactively awarded test status caps to its own players for those matches.

Overall

Records
Note: Date shown in brackets indicates when the record was or last set.

Tri Nations and the professional era (1996–2011)

The professional era in rugby union began in 1995, marked by creation of the SANZAR group (a combination of South Africa, New Zealand and Australia) which was formed with the purpose of selling TV rights for two new competitions, the domestic Super 12 competition and the Tri-Nations.

The first Tri-Nations was contested in 1996, with New Zealand winning all four of their Tests to take the trophy. 

In 2000 in Sydney, a record crowd of 109,874 witnessed what some have called 'The Greatest Ever Rugby Match' when the All Blacks defeated The Wallabies 39–35. Twenty one days after their win in Sydney, the All Blacks lost to the Wallabies in front of a home crowd. This meant the Wallabies won The Bledisloe Cup for the third year in a row.

Another one of the most dramatic matches was played on 1 September 2001 at Stadium Australia, in what would be Wallaby great John Eales' last ever test. The Wallabies were hoping to send their skipper off in a grand style. A fairy tale ending was looking possible in the first half as the Wallabies took a 19-6 lead over the All Blacks. However, tries for Doug Howlett and Pita Alatini, along with Andrew Mehrtens kicking, saw the All Blacks back in front 26–22. Then, in the dying moments of the game No.8 Toutai Kefu scored the winning try for the Wallabies. Two years later in 2003 the Wallabies suffered one of their most humiliating losses, being defeated 21–50 by the All Blacks in Sydney.

In 2008, a Bledisloe Cup match was played in Hong Kong, which New Zealand won 19–14. It was rumoured that the United States and Japan would host future Bledisloe Cup matches, and these rumours proved true in the case of Japan, as Tokyo hosted a 2009 Bledisloe match.

The first two Tests of the 2010 series saw the All Blacks extend their winning streak over the Wallabies to 10 games. (Australia's last previous win came on 26 July 2008 at Sydney.) The third and fourth tests were extremely tight affairs, both being won by late tries. In the Sydney test on 11 September, converted tries by Richie McCaw and Kieran Read in the last 13 minutes allowed the All Blacks to overcome a 9–22 deficit.  The win saw New Zealand complete a 100% record in the 2010 Tri-Nations. On 30 October 2010 the sides contested the now-customary fourth annual Bledisloe Cup test at a neutral venue. As in 2009, the match was played in Hong Kong, and as on 11 September the game was won with a dramatic late comeback. On this occasion the Wallabies, having led early in the match, found themselves 19–24 down as the hooter went, but with possession in the All Black 22. The Wallabies recycled through numerous phases of possession, until finally the ball was passed wide to James O'Connor, who beat the scrambling All Black defence to touch down and level the scores. The 20-year-old winger then kicked the resulting conversion to win the match for the Wallabies, ending New Zealand's recent domination of the fixture.

Subsequently, (2011–2014) the All Blacks have won eight of the last eleven games played, with two drawn, continuing their domination. This included a crucial 20–6 victory over the Wallabies in the 2011 World Cup Semi-final to enable to All Blacks to progress to the final and subsequently win the World Cup.

Rugby Championship era (since 2012)

Starting in 2012, the Tri Nations competition was renamed The Rugby Championship, and now includes Argentina.

On 17 August 2013 the All Blacks celebrated their 100th win over the Wallabies with a 47–29 victory in Sydney. After a shock 12–12 draw in Sydney in the first game of the 2014 series, which ended the All Blacks' attempt at the record of 18 straight wins for a major rugby nation, the All Blacks posted their highest ever score against Australia with a 51–20 victory at Eden Park on 23 August 2014. 

In 2022, matches between Australia and New Zealand were reduced from a minimum of three per year, to two per year until 2025.

Results

Pre World War I (1903–1914)
The first Test between Australia and New Zealand was played on 15 August 1903 at the Sydney Cricket Ground. Despite the Wallabies losing 22–3 this tour greatly increased the popularity of rugby and large crowds started attending grade matches in Sydney and Brisbane. New Zealand winger Billy Wallace scored thirteen of their twenty-two points.

XV results (1920–1928)
From 1920 to 1928, twenty-four matches took place for which Australia retrospectively awarded test caps and test match status. New Zealand did not award test caps. Out of these twenty-four matches, Australia won six, New Zealand eighteen.

Pre World War II (1929–1938)
Australia's last Test before World War I was against New Zealand in July 1914. The sports authorities in Australia decided it was unpatriotic to play rugby while thousands of young Australian men were being sent overseas to fight. This resulted in competitions all but closed down in New South Wales and Queensland. In Queensland regular competitions did not commence again until 1928. As a result, players switched to rugby league in large numbers. Even though there was no Australia/New Zealand game after the war before 1929, twenty-four games were held between New South Wales and New Zealand XV from 1920 to 1928. The results were eighteen victories against six for the All Blacks with sixteen games taking place in Sydney, New South Wales (most of them at the Royal Agricultural Society Ground) and the rest in New Zealand. Those games are counted as Australia/New Zealand on the IRB website. Also 1931 saw the first game played competing for the Bledisloe Cup. However the "official" first Bledisloe Cup match wasn't played until 1932.

Post War (1946–1974)
The first test following World War Two was played at Carisbrook, Dunedin between Australia and New Zealand in 1946, which New Zealand won 31–8. Australia did not win on the three-match tour; beaten 20–0 by New Zealand Māori, and then losing 14–10 to New Zealand the following week. The 1949 tour witnessed an infamous New Zealand record – the loss of two test matches on the same day. This was made possible because New Zealand's first team (and best thirty players) were touring South Africa at the same time. On the afternoon of 3 September New Zealand captained by J. B. Smith was beaten 11–6 by the Wallabies in Wellington. On 23 September New Zealand also lost their second Test, 16–9, which gave the Wallabies the Bledisloe Cup for the first time.

Full amateur tours (1978–1995)
The period before the game finally turned professional was fairly brief and saw the final touring years between the two sides. It was also the period in which the first Rugby World Cup in 1987, co-hosted between Australia and New Zealand, was played. Between 1978 and 1995, Australia and New Zealand toured each other five and six times, respectively. The two teams played each other thirty-six times, New Zealand winning twenty-one of them, Australia fourteen.

Professional era (since 1995)
Since the professional era, Australia and New Zealand have played each other consistently every year. Sometimes up to four times in a single year (2008, 2009, 2010, 2020), which is more times than any other two sides. Overall since the mid 1990s, the two teams have played each other over seventy times, including the 2003 Rugby World Cup Semi-final, the 2011 Rugby World Cup Semi-final and the 2015 Rugby World Cup Final. Currently in the "professional era", New Zealand holds over fifty victories, with Australia holing eighteen.

List of series

See also

Australia–New Zealand sports rivalries

Notes

References

External links
Complete List of all Results at ESPN

 
Australia national rugby union team matches
New Zealand national rugby union team matches
Rugby union rivalries in Australia
Rugby union rivalries in New Zealand
Australia–New Zealand sports relations